Hubert Köpfler (born 15 September 1935) is a Swiss figure skater. He is a five time (1953, 1957, 1959–1961) Swiss national champion. He represented Switzerland at the 1960 Winter Olympics where he placed 11th.

Competitive highlights

References

 
 List of Historical Swiss Champions

Swiss male single skaters
Olympic figure skaters of Switzerland
Figure skaters at the 1960 Winter Olympics
Living people
1935 births